The 2015 Atlantic Championship Series season is the third season of the revived Atlantic Championship. The series was organised by Formula Race Promotions under the sanctioning of SCCA Pro Racing.

Drivers and teams

Race calendar and results

Championship standings

This list only contains drivers who registered for the championship.

See also
 2015 F1600 Championship Series season
 2015 F2000 Championship Series season

References

External links
 Official website

Atlantic Season 2015
Atlantic Championship seasons